Mehran Amiri (born January 28, 1994) is an Iranian midfielder who plays for Iranian football club Naft Masjed Soleyman in the Persian Gulf League.

External links 
Mehran Amiri on instagram

References

1991 births
Living people
Giti Pasand players
Association football forwards
Iranian footballers
People from Semirom